The MacLaren Art Centre is an art gallery and museum, located in Barrie, Ontario, Canada. 

It is named in honour of Maurice MacLaren, who bequeathed his Victorian home, Maple Hill, to the Barrie Gallery Project in 1989. The MacLaren Art Centre later moved to the former City of Barrie library, a Carnegie building, and added to it; the new gallery opened in September 2001. The building was designed by Siamak Hariri of Hariri Pontarini Architects. The first piece in the gallery's collection is the Spirit Catcher, a sculpture by Ron Baird, first displayed at Expo '86 in Vancouver, and donated by the Peacock Foundation.

See also
 List of art museums
 List of museums in Ontario

References

Art museums and galleries in Ontario
Buildings and structures in Barrie
Art museums established in 2001
2001 establishments in Ontario
Museums in Simcoe County
Non-profit organizations based in Barrie
Culture of Barrie